Historic Collinsville, located in south Montgomery County, Tennessee in Southside, is a recreated village that offers a glimpse into mid 19th century life. It contains era specific homes and buildings.  Many events are held to celebrate history and the community.  1830s-1870 buildings.

External links
  Official site

Living museums in Tennessee
Museums in Montgomery County, Tennessee